Pantaleon Diaz Alvarez (born January 10, 1958) is a Filipino politician serving as the Representative of Davao del Norte's 1st district since 2016, previously holding the position from 1998 to 2001. He served as the Speaker of the House of Representatives from 2016 to 2018. He also served as the Secretary of Transportation and Communications in the Cabinet of President Gloria Macapagal Arroyo from 2001 to 2002.

He is a stern advocate to shift the current centralized set-up of the Philippines into a federal form, pushing for the establishment of an indigenous state in Luzon and an indigenous state in Mindanao. Initially in favor of an independent Mindanao, Alvarez changed stance when Rodrigo Duterte talked about a federal Philippines with him. In 2017, Alvarez proposed a new set-up to spearheaded federalism in the Philippines.

Early life and education 
Alvarez was born on January 10, 1958. In 1978, he obtained a bachelor of arts (AB) degree from Far Eastern University. He then studied law and graduated from the Ateneo de Manila Law School in 1983.

Career 

Alvarez was in private law practice from 1984 to 1986. From 1987 to 1992, he was a member of the staff of Philippine Senator Wigberto Tañada. He then became an action officer at the Manila International Airport Authority (MIAA). From action officer, he rose through the ranks, becoming senior assistant manager and chief operating officer of MIAA in March 1995, a position he held until September 1997.

In 1998, he was elected congressman from Davao del Norte's 1st District. He served as vice-chairman of the House Committee on Transportation and Communication and was a member of nine other congressional committees.

In January 2001, President Gloria Macapagal Arroyo appointed him acting Secretary of Transportation and Communications, where he served until July 2002.  Among Alvarez's achievements were the adoption of the light railway expansion program, improvement of the Philippine National Railway, and computerization of the department and attached agencies. He also spearheaded the slogan "OKS na OKS sa DOTC" which means "Organisado, Kalinisan at Seguridad".

In 2016, he was once again elected congressman from Davao del Norte's 1st District. On the opening of the 17th Congress on July 25, he was elected as the 24th Speaker of the House of Representatives with 251 votes. On July 23, 2018, he was ousted as Speaker and was replaced by Pampanga Representative Gloria Macapagal Arroyo.

Alvarez was re-elected as congressman in 2019 and in 2022. On November 15, 2020, he tendered his "irrevocable resignation" from PDP–Laban and joined the Reporma Party.

Issues

Prejudicial policy making and leadership 
In finalizing the General Appropriations Act of 2018, Alvarez and his allies deliberately withheld infrastructure funding from the members of the House of Representatives who they found "undesirable". Alvarez stated that it was unfair for the members who cooperated with him and the President to receive funding less than those representatives. The total amount of funds reallocated to cooperative members was suspected to amount to 11 Billion Pesos. When asked about the welfare of those regions which will be negatively affected by the reallocation of the budget, Alvarez was unapologetic and told the affected citizens in the regions to blame their representatives for the retaliatory budget cuts. Various members of the House of Representatives were alarmed and pointed out the dictatorial and vengeful nature of the Duterte administration and the alacrity in the leadership of Alvarez in perpetuating it.

Alvarez has threatened congressmen and various governmental agencies that they would receive zero budget if they didn't support Rodrigo Duterte's plans to supplant the Republic of the Philippines by implementing PDP–Laban's Federal form of Government. Alvarez stated that he did not care whether the provinces, agencies and local governments affected by his budget cuts would suffer and told the people to blame their representatives instead who refused to follow what Duterte wanted. Senator Aquilino "Nene" Pimentel Jr. warned Alvarez that "nobody stays in power forever", insinuating that Alvarez would receive his just deserts after his blatant abuse of power and authority.

"Persona Non-Grata" in PDP–Laban 
In August 2017, Alvarez was declared "Persona Non Grata" by his own party mates in PDP Laban, Rogelio Garcia and Cesar Cuntapay, stating that Alvarez actions in reorganizing the party nationwide without authority and recruiting new members in exchange for favors severely damaged the party's credibility and Duterte's own legitimacy in his war against drugs. Benito Ranque, PDP–Laban deputy secretary general, states that the new members are not even educated or informed of the party's constitution and by-laws, in support of Cuntapay's accusations. There were also reports that the new politicians that Alvarez recruited are "narco-politicians", involved in illegal drugs manufacturing and trafficking. Senate President Aquilino "Koko" Pimentel III, PDP–Laban's president, however, denied the reports that Alvarez is persona-non-grata despite the numerous PDP–Laban members disdain for Alvarez and his insubordinate actions which violated PDP–Laban's own constitution and by-laws. Pimentel retaliated against Garcia and Cuntapay by ordering them silenced or be disciplined. Alvarez stated that "grumbling members" should either leave or he will "take care" of them.

Alleged Graft in PIATCO-Fraport NAIA 3 deal
In 2005, Alvarez along with four other former DOTC officials were charged with graft before the Sandiganbayan in connection with the construction of NAIA Terminal 3. In 2010, the charges were dismissed by the Sandiganbayan Special Second Division due to lack of evidence.

Pantaleon Alvarez allegedly used information gained by his position to preempt the bidding process by creating a company called Wintrack which the board awarded a major sub-contract for the project's site development and excavation work. Alvarez and other member of the Piatco and Fraport became board members of Wintrack, benefiting and amassing profits from the deal. The staggering income gotten by Wintrack from the deal has prompted the Ombudsman to file a case of graft against Alvarez and his cohorts.

Martial law in Mindanao 
Alvarez was an advocate for the secession of all of Mindanao from the Philippines.

He is in favor of extending the martial law in Mindanao until 2022, the end of Rodrigo Duterte's term, citing the threat of terrorism and insurgency in Mindanao.

Abolition of Court of Appeals 
Alvarez has threatened to dissolve the Court of Appeals and to disbar CA Special Fourth Division, Stephen Cruz, Edwin Sorongon and Nina Antonino-Valenzuela, for granting the habeas corpus petition of six Ilocos Norte officials under their custody for the investigation regarding the "Tobacco Funds" issue. Alvarez in a radio interview said, “They are not even our co-equal branch… They are merely a creation of Congress—that Court of Appeals. They only exist because they were created by Congress. Any time, we can dissolve them. So they better start thinking,”.

Alvarez has repeatedly publicly campaigned for the abolition of the Court of Appeals, stating that the said court only allowed lawyers to use delaying tactics and gives corrupt judges ways to abuse their power. He stated that in the federalism set-up he's proposing, he will create special courts that will allow him to dispense speedier "justice".

Influence peddling and "imbecile" Facebook post 
A customs official accused Alvarez of peddling influence at the Bureau of Customs (BOC). Mandy Anderson, a BOC official, said that Alvarez had been using his position as a lawmaker to urge BOC commissioner Nicanor Faeldon to appoint Alvarez's recommendations. The accusation came after Majority Leader Rodolfo Fariñas scolded Anderson at a congressional hearing due to a Facebook status message wherein Anderson called Alvarez an "imbecile" for threatening to dissolve the Court of Appeals. Alvarez denied Anderson's claims, saying that he does not know the customs officers whose promotion he endorsed except through their resumés.

Marriage dissolution bill
Alvarez, along with 14 co-authors, had formally filed House Bill No. 6027, titled "An Act Providing for Grounds for the Dissolution of a Marriage". The bill lists irreconcilable differences or severe and chronic unhappiness causing the "irreparable breakdown of marriage" as the possible grounds for its dissolution. The bill prescribes imprisonment of 5 years in prison if spouse is forced to petition for "marriage dissolution". After news of the filing, Alvarez's wife broke her silence and revealed her grievances regarding her marriage with Alvarez, revealing that she has long since known that Alvarez had been cheating on her countless times. That it was only during after he became Speaker that Alvarez had completely broke off relations with her.

In an interview, Emelita Alvarez said “Actually I was abandoned right after SONA when he became the Speaker. We’ve been together for almost 30 years and I’ve been there since the very start that was in ’88. We’ve been through ups and downs, I’m there and people of Davao del Norte will testify that I was even the one who campaigned for him but anyway life should go on”.

Emelita Alvarez also refuted her husband's claim that he's from the Manobo tribe, wherein polygamy is allegedly acceptable. She states that Alvarez was clearly a Catholic when she married him.

Impeachment efforts against the Vice President and Chief Justice 
Alvarez has been known for facilitating and endorsing impeachment efforts against Vice President, Robredo and Supreme Court Chief Justice, Sereno. Alvarez's endorsed impeachment complaint against Robredo came after the Vice President reported to the United Nations the state of the country and the War on Drugs that President Duterte's administration is currently conducting. Alvarez claims that Robredo's act of portraying the country in a bad light is a betrayal of public trust, and thus impeachable. Alvarez has also revealed that the congress will be discussing possible impeachment complaint against Chief Justice Sereno for meddling in the case of the Congress' detention of Ilocos-6, wherein Sereno granted the right of habeas corpus to the six individuals.

Death penalty advocate 
Alvarez has been a staunch supporter of reviving capital punishment, despite the United Nations' moratorium on death penalties, even going so far as to threaten the "dismissal" of representatives who refused to sign the death penalty bill. Alvarez also advocates and encourages the killing of criminals, following the Duterte administration's zero tolerance policy on crimes and corruption.

Animosity against the Catholic Church 
Alvarez has been a vocal critic of the Catholic Church for opposing the death penalty bill and the Duterte's administration's War on Drugs. This led to his calls for pro-death penalty Catholics to change religion, and to propose taxation of Catholic-run schools, despite its expressed exclusion in the Philippine Civil Code.

Close ties with the President 

Alvarez, a longtime ally of President Rodrigo Duterte, became House Speaker right after the PDP–Laban reshuffled after the election results came out.

Since then, Alvarez has backed Duterte on issues, like the Martial Law in Mindanao, the postponement of Barangay Elections, and Duterte's War on Drugs, which he even promoted to the ASEAN.

There is general consensus that as long as Duterte is in power, Alvarez will remain a House Speaker.

Many critics have expressed that other than having close ties with the President, Alvarez is ill-suited for his position as a Speaker, due to his ineffectiveness in uniting the house to pass bills on critical issues.

Siargao land purchases 
The Speaker has multiple properties in Siargao, a popular tourist town known for its surfing area, with Government records showing that he owns at least 7 properties which have appreciated in value given the increasing popularity of the island.  The Speaker, however, defended these land purchases, saying he purchased the properties years ago.

Personal life
Alvarez's daughter Paola is the current PDP–Laban spokesperson as well as an Assistant Secretary in the Department of Finance.

Duterte once jokingly claimed Alvarez is a Muslim, though there is no proof of such claim, and admitted to have fathered eight children from three different women out of wedlock. Although legally married, he is in a relationship with Jennifer Vicencio.

References

|-

|-

|-

|-

1958 births
Living people
Members of the House of Representatives of the Philippines from Davao del Norte
PDP–Laban politicians
Secretaries of Transportation of the Philippines
Far Eastern University alumni
Ateneo de Manila University alumni
Arroyo administration cabinet members
Speakers of the House of Representatives of the Philippines
People from Tagum
Filipino Muslims
Critics of the Catholic Church